Sharp Brothers House is a historic home located at Guilderland in Albany County, New York.  The rear section was built about 1850 and the front about 1880.  It is a large, -story Queen Anne–style dwelling.  It features a steeply pitched, multi-gabled roof and paneled chimneys.

It was listed on the National Register of Historic Places in 1982.

References

Houses on the National Register of Historic Places in New York (state)
Houses completed in 1850
Queen Anne architecture in New York (state)
Houses in Albany County, New York
National Register of Historic Places in Albany County, New York